Sayyid Mostafa Agha Mirsalim (born 10 June 1947) is an Iranian engineer and conservative politician. He is currently member of the Expediency Discernment Council and also a member of Islamic Consultative Assembly.

He was a presidential candidate at the 2017 election which placed third with receiving 1.16% of the votes.

Early life and education 
He obtained B.Sc. in Mechanics from Universite de Poitiers in 1969, M.Sc. in Mechanics from École nationale supérieure de mécanique et d'aérotechnique and M.Sc. Fluid Mechanics & Thermodynamics from Attestation d`Eludes Approfondies, Universite de Poitiers both in 1971 and M.Sc. in Internal Combustion Engines  from École Nationale Supérieure du Pétrole et des Moteurs in 1972.

He worked as an intern in Alsace Mechanical Industries until 1976, when he returned to Iran. He worked at Tehran Metro as the operational director from 1976 to 1979.

Career 
Mir-Salim served as the national police chief following the Iranian Revolution. He was proposed by then president Abulhassan Banisadr in July 1980 as a candidate for the prime minister as a compromise candidate acceptable to both Banisadr and the Majlis dominated by the Islamic Republican Party. However, Banisadr was pressured to accept Mohammad-Ali Rajai instead. From 1981 to 1989, Mir-Salim was the advisor to then president Ayatollah Khamenei.

In the beginning of 1989, on the occasion of the death and funeral of Hirohito, the 124th Emperor of Japan who had ruled for over 60 years until he died on January 7, Mir-Salim and Hossein Saffar Harandi, a Member of Parliament and the Chairman of Parliament Committee on Agriculture, went to the Imperial Palace in Tokyo to attend the Rites of Imperial Funeral on February 24 with Mohammad Hossein Adeli, Ambassador Extraordinary Plenipotentiary in Japan, and his wife.

Mir-Salim was appointed Minister of Culture and Islamic Guidance in 1994. His tenure was characterized by a strongly conservative Islamist direction, aiming to stave off the "cultural onslaught" of Western culture and promote pious Islamic culture in its place, including through the use of repressive measures. The Ministry under his direction was particularly known for closing a number of reformist newspapers.

He was later appointed to the Expediency Discernment Council.

He is assistant professor of mechanical engineering at Amirkabir University of Technology, Tehran.

Electoral history

Personal life 
According to Iranian Diplomacy, Mirsalim  is married to an Iranian  woman. He is fond of swimming and usually wears shenandoah beard, collarless tuxedos and dark calottes that serve as his signature look.

References

1947 births
Living people
Politicians from Tehran
University of Poitiers alumni
Members of the Expediency Discernment Council
Government ministers of Iran
Islamic Coalition Party politicians
Islamic Society of Athletes politicians
Central Council of the Islamic Republican Party members
Iranian expatriates in France
Iranian mechanical engineers
20th-century Iranian engineers
20th-century Iranian politicians